Polyniki Emmanouilidou (born 30 June 2003), is a Greek sprinter. She competed in the 60 metres event at the 2023 European Athletics Indoor Championships in Istanbul.

Honours & competition record

References

2003 births
Living people
Greek female sprinters
Olympic female sprinters
Olympic athletes of Greece
Athletes from Thessaloniki
21st-century Greek women